Sowno may refer to the following places:
Sowno, Gryfice County in West Pomeranian Voivodeship (north-west Poland)
Sowno, Koszalin County in West Pomeranian Voivodeship (north-west Poland)
Sowno, Stargard County in West Pomeranian Voivodeship (north-west Poland)